Wojciech Szymanek (born 1 March 1982 in Warsaw) is a Polish football manager and former player, most recently in charge of Polonia Warsaw.

Career

Club
He was released from Widzew Łódź on 22 June 2011.

In July 2011, he signed a one-year contract with Ukrainian Premier League side FC Chornomorets Odesa.

After a one-year stint with the Ukrainian club, he rejoined his first team Polonia in August 2012.

References

External links
 

1982 births
Living people
Polish footballers
Polonia Warsaw players
Egaleo F.C. players
Widzew Łódź players
FC Chornomorets Odesa players
Podbeskidzie Bielsko-Biała players
Ekstraklasa players
Ukrainian Premier League players
Polish expatriate footballers
Expatriate footballers in Greece
Expatriate footballers in Ukraine
Footballers from Warsaw
Polish expatriate sportspeople in Greece
Polish expatriate sportspeople in Ukraine
Association football midfielders
Polish football managers